Albstadt is the largest city in the district of Zollernalbkreis in Baden-Württemberg, Germany. It is located on the Swabian Jura mountains, about halfway between Stuttgart and Lake Constance.

Geography
One valley is the river Schmiecha, a left-hand tributary of the Danube, a second valley is the river of upper Eyach, a tributary of the Neckar.

To Albstadt belongs also the Raichberg hill in the north, on which there is the Raichberg Transmitter and an observation tower located. South of Albstadt is the Heuberg Military Training Area.

History
Settlement in the region dates back to at least the Iron Age. A Hallstatt cemetery in Albstadt was excavated by amateur archaeologists in the late nineteenth century and revealed a wide range of pottery and metal artefacts. Known as the 'Degerfeld Barrow' cemetery, a substantial collection was built up by the local antiquary Hyronimus Edelmann that was eventually deposited in the British Museum.

Religion 
The following religions are present in Albstadt:
 Roman Catholic Church
YMCA Tailfingen
 Evangelische Landeskirche in Württemberg 
 New Apostolic Church in Tailfingen
 Gospel Forum in Ebingen
 Pauluskirche, United Methodist Church parish in Ebingen
 Versammlung of the Brüderbewegung in the Johanneskirche, John Nelson DarbyTailfingen
 Gemeinschaftsstunde Süddeutsche Gemeinschaft, Liebenzell Mission, Evangelischer Gnadauer Gemeinschaftsverband not allowed in the protestant church in Truchtelfingen and Tailfingen
 Russian Orthodox Church in Tailfingen Schlossstaße Tailfingen. Servie in Balingen Siechenkirche and Meßstetten Lamprechtskirche
TOS
 Gemeinde Gottes
 Adventisten

Economy and Infrastructure
Most of the textiles industry (among them Hasana J. Hakenmüller) is gone today, leaving some monuments, like Villa Haux. However, one of the world's biggest makers of industrial needles, Groz-Beckert, is still based in the town. Other prominent local companies include Mey (knitwear), Mettler Toledo (weighing systems) and a major part of Assa Abloy security systems (Eff-Eff Brand). Ebingen also hosts the technical and computer science faculties of Albstadt-Sigmaringen University with about 3,000 students (2014).

Education
Albstadt presides over its own modern school system, with elementary through high school provided all within the same city, including Kindergartens and  boarding schools for the mentally and physically challenged. Also, the city library offers free internet access to residents.

University
The university was founded in 1971 and has two campus locations, Albstadt and Sigmaringen.
On Albstadt campus you will find our Faculty of Engineering and our Faculty of Computing, while our Faculty of Business Administration and the Faculty of Life Science are located on Sigmaringen campus

Sport School
Coach (sport)

Mining

In former times iron ore was produced in Albstadt. Fidel Eppler was the name of the mine-inspector. The buttress wood was bought in  Truchtelfingen and used from Lautlinger Knappen at the Hörnle area . From an old 3,5 km mine in a Doggererzflöz in Weilheim is wood in the Tuttlinger Fruchtkasten .
Steel was produced in Tuttlingen by the Schwäbische Hüttenwerke in Ludwigstal, today iron brakes.

Sports
In the city of Ebingen  and Tailfingen, there is a Soccer stadium complex.

The YMCA  do Handball, indiaca, Soccer,  and natural sports in Halls and the Sportgelände Markenberg YMCA.

Districts
The districts Ebingen, Laufen, Lautlingen, Pfeffingen und Tailfingen were first mentioned in 793 in a document of the abbey St. Gallen. Ebingen received city rights around 1250 from the Hohenberg ducal family.

Albstadt consists of the following urban districts, which had been independent towns and merged to form Albstadt in 1975:

Population
 1975: 50,772
 1987: 46,369
 1995: 49,463
 2005: 46,505
 2015: 44,431

Lord Mayors of Albstadt
 1975–1991: Hans Pfarr (CDU)
 1991–1999: Hans-Martin Haller (SPD)
 1999–2015: Jürgen Gneveckow (CDU)
 since 2015: Klaus Konzelmann (Free voters Baden-Württemberg)

Notable people

 Walther Groz (1903–2000), producer, mayor of Ebingen
 Kurt Georg Kiesinger (1904–1988), lawyer and politician (CDU), Prime Minister of Baden-Württemberg (1958–1966) and Chancellor (1966–1969)
 Gregor Dorfmeister (also known as Manfred Gregor; born 1929), journalist and writer
 Jürgen Gneveckow (born 1952), mayor of Albstadt in 1999–2015
 Klaus Konzelmann (born 1963), police official and mayor of Albstadt
 Monika Herzig (born 1964), jazz musician and musicologist

Personalities who have worked on the ground

 Philipp Matthäus Hahn (1739–1790), pastor, designer and inventor, lived in Onstmettingen in 1764–1770
 Ignaz Anton Demeter (1773–1842), 1802–1808 first Parish Councilor in Lautlingen, 1836–1842 Archbishop of Freiburg.
 Otto Hahn (1879–1968), chemist, nuclear scientist, Nobel laureate. After the Kaiser Wilhelm Institute was bombed out in Berlin in the spring of 1944, he researched from June 1944 to April 1945 in Tailfingen.
 Berthold Schenk Graf von Stauffenberg (1905–1944), jurist, participant in the assassination attempt on Adolf Hitler; spent parts of his youth in Lautlingen
 Claus von Stauffenberg (1907–1944), officer, assassin on Adolf Hitler; spent parts of his youth in Lautlingen
 Martin Schaudt (born 1958), dressage rider

Twin towns – sister cities

Albstadt is twinned with:
 Chambéry, France

See also
Kern & Sohn (1844)

References

External links

Sammlung Hieronymus Edelmann (1853–1921), Hyronimus Edelmann British Museum

 
Towns in Baden-Württemberg
Württemberg